Stamma may refer to:

 Stamma, the British Stammering Association
 Philipp Stamma, ( – c. 1755), a chess master

See also 

 Stammer